Bubbling Troubles is an American 1940 Our Gang short comedy film directed by Edward Cahn. It was the 187th Our Gang short (188th episode, 99th talking short, 100th talking episode, and 19th MGM produced episode) that was released.

Plot
Butch wins the heart of Darla, leaving heartbroken Alfalfa to cry in his alphabet soup. Mistaking the boy's doldrums for indigestion, Alfalfa's dad prepares to give his son a good dose of Settles-It Powder. Later on, the kids pay a visit to Butch's jerry-built chemistry lab where he is mixing up what he claims is an explosive. Recognizing the mixture as Settles-It Powder, Alfalfa offers himself as Butch's guinea pig, bravely downing the concoction in hopes of impressing Darla. Unfortunately, the powders have not been properly combined, and before long Alfalfa becomes drastically bloated and the rest of the gang is convinced that he has become a walking bomb.

Notes
Tommy Bond made his final appearance with Our Gang in this film, after spending two-and-a-half years as "Butch", a recurring character and the Gang's ongoing nemesis. He also was in the Gang as a recurring character from 1932 to 1934, giving him a total of five years.

Cast

The Gang
 Carl Switzer as Alfalfa
 Mickey Gubitosi as Mickey
 Darla Hood as Darla
 George McFarland as Spanky
 Billie Thomas as Buckwheat
 Leonard Landy as Leonard

Additional cast
 Tommy Bond as Butch
 Barbara Bedford as Alfalfa's mother
 Hank Mann as Butch's father
 William Newell as Alfalfa's father
 Harry Strang as explosives worker
 George the Monkey as Monkey

See also
 Our Gang filmography

References

External links
 
 

1940 films
American black-and-white films
Films directed by Edward L. Cahn
Metro-Goldwyn-Mayer short films
1940 comedy films
Our Gang films
1940 short films
1940s American films